Parashorea parvifolia is a species of plant in the family Dipterocarpaceae. The name parvifolia is derived from Latin (parvus = small and folia = leaf) and refers to species small leaves (6-9 x 3–4.5 cm). It is endemic to Borneo (Brunei, Sabah, Sarawak and east Kalimantan). It is a large emergent tree, up to 60 m tall, found in mixed dipterocarp forests on fertile clay soils. It is present in protected areas, including Lambir Hills National Park.

References

parvifolia
Endemic flora of Borneo
Trees of Borneo